Eimar Ultan O'Duffy (29 September 1893 – 21 March 1935) was born in Dublin and educated at Belvedere College in Dublin, Stonyhurst College in Lancashire and at University College Dublin.

He and Bulmer Hobson caused disaster to the plans for the 1916 Easter Rising when they told Eoin MacNeill that the Rising was planned for the next week; MacNeill, nominal head of the Irish Volunteers, reacted by sending messengers around the country to call off the manoeuvres which were the cover for the Rising, and advertising in newspapers to cancel them. O'Duffy and Hobson went to the North.

Publications
O'Duffy was a prolific writer. His The Wasted Island, published in 1919 by Martin Lester Publication in Dublin and republished in 1920 by Dodd, Mead and Company in New York City, is his best known book; it is a Roman à clef about the Easter Rising and the men who made it, with thinly-disguised and slanted portraits of the leaders. Its point-of-view protagonist, Bernard Lascelles, is based on O'Duffy, and its hero, the attractive and loveable Felim O'Dwyer, perhaps on Thomas MacDonagh (though since O'Dwyer towards the end of the novel is one of the group with Lascelles who tries to stymie the Rising, this may not be altogether so). 
King Goshawk and the Birds was reprinted by Dalkey Archive Press in 2017, with a new introduction by Robert Hogan. The Spacious Adventures of the Man in the Street was also reprinted by Dalkey Archive Press in 2018.

O'Duffy married Cathleen Cruise O'Brien in 1920, and they had a son, Brian, and a daughter, Rosalind.

Works
The Walls of Athens (1914)
The Phoenix on the Roof (1915)
The Wasted Island (1919)
The Lion and the Fox (1921)
Printer's Errors (1922)
Miss Rudd and Some Lovers (1923)
King Goshawk and the Birds (1926) - satire
The Spacious Adventures of the Man in the Street (1928) - satire
Life and Money: Being a Critical Examination of the Principles and Practice of Orthodox Economics  
The Bird Cage (New York, 1932), 
The Secret Enemy (New York, 1932)
Asses in Clover (London: Putnam's 1933) - satire
Consumer Credit: A Pamphlet. London: The Prosperity League, 1934
Heart of a Girl: A Mystery Novel (London: Geoffrey Bles, 1935 New York, 1935)

References

External links
 
 O'Duffy's Ricorso entry
 New edition of King Goshawk and the Birds

Writers from Dublin (city)
Members of the Irish Republican Brotherhood
1893 births
1939 deaths
Alumni of University College Dublin
People educated at Stonyhurst College
People educated at Belvedere College